Rumigny is a commune in the Ardennes department in the  Grand Est region in northern France.

It lies near Rozoy-sur-Serre,  from Mon Idée on the border with Belgium, at the junction of routes D877 and D977.

Population

Personalities
Rumigny was the birthplace of the astronomer Nicolas Louis de Lacaille.

See also
Communes of the Ardennes department

References

Communes of Ardennes (department)
Ardennes communes articles needing translation from French Wikipedia